In Greek mythology, Diocles (Ancient Greek: Διοκλῆς Dioklēs) may refer to:

Diocles of Pherae, son of Orsilochus and possibly the brother of Medusa, wife of Polybus of Corinth and Dorodoche, wife of Icarius of Sparta. He was the father of the twins Orsilochus and Crethon, and also of Anticleia, the mother of Nicomachus and Gorgasus by Machaon. In the Odyssey, Telemachus and Peisistratus spent a night at his house on their way to Sparta, as well as on their way back.
Diocles or Dioclus, king and one of the first priests of Demeter, and one of the first to learn the secrets of the Eleusinian Mysteries, along with Triptolemus and Polyxenus.
Diocles, king of Megara, who was overthrown by Theseus, as a result of which Eleusis was annexed from Megara. He may be identical with #2.

Notes

References 

 Homer, The Iliad with an English Translation by A.T. Murray, Ph.D. in two volumes. Cambridge, MA., Harvard University Press; London, William Heinemann, Ltd. 1924. Online version at the Perseus Digital Library.
 Homer, Homeri Opera in five volumes. Oxford, Oxford University Press. 1920. Greek text available at the Perseus Digital Library.
 Homer, The Odyssey with an English Translation by A.T. Murray, PH.D. in two volumes. Cambridge, MA., Harvard University Press; London, William Heinemann, Ltd. 1919. Online version at the Perseus Digital Library. Greek text available from the same website.
 Lucius Mestrius Plutarchus, Lives with an English Translation by Bernadotte Perrin. Cambridge, MA. Harvard University Press. London. William Heinemann Ltd. 1914. 1. Online version at the Perseus Digital Library. Greek text available from the same website.
 Pausanias, Description of Greece with an English Translation by W.H.S. Jones, Litt.D., and H.A. Ormerod, M.A., in 4 Volumes. Cambridge, MA, Harvard University Press; London, William Heinemann Ltd. 1918. Online version at the Perseus Digital Library
 Pausanias, Graeciae Descriptio. 3 vols. Leipzig, Teubner. 1903.  Greek text available at the Perseus Digital Library.
 The Homeric Hymns and Homerica with an English Translation by Hugh G. Evelyn-White. Homeric Hymns. Cambridge, MA.,Harvard University Press; London, William Heinemann Ltd. 1914. Online version at the Perseus Digital Library. Greek text available from the same website.

Kings in Greek mythology
Eleusinian characters in Greek mythology
Messenian mythology